Hljod or Ljod (Old Norse: Hljóð ) is a jötunn in Norse mythology. She is  the spouse of Völsung, the daughter of the jötunn Hrímnir, and the mother of Sigmund and Signy.

Name 
The Old Norse name Hljóð has been translated as 'howling'.

Attestation 
In the first chapter of Völsunga saga, Hljóð is portrayed as the daughter of the jötunn Hrímnir, and as a 'wish-maiden' of the god Odin, which could be interpreted as 'Valkyrie of Odin'.

Hljóð then assumes the shape of a crow and provides the apple of fertility to the childless Rerir, who eventually begets Hljóð's own husband Völsung.

References

Bibliography 
 
 

Germanic heroic legends
Gýgjar
Valkyries